Manuel Dias may refer to:

 Manuel Dias the Younger (1574–1659), Portuguese Jesuit missionary
 Manuel Dias (athlete) (1905–?), Portuguese athlete